Christopher McHallem (born 1960) is a British actor, writer, musician and director.

McHallem began his career in 1977 with the punk rock/post-punk band the Transmitters under the pseudonym "Dexter O'Brian", but left the band shortly after its formation to pursue a career in acting.

He is well remembered for playing the role of Rod Norman, the kind-hearted roadie with a soft spot for hopeless causes, in the popular BBC soap opera, EastEnders. A role that he played from 1987 to 1990.

Since quitting EastEnders McHallem has appeared in the 1991 film Edward II; the ITV drama Heartbeat (1993); in the Steve Coogan comedy sketch show Coogan's Run (1995); the 1998 film St. Ives; the 2003 film Girl with a Pearl Earring - a screenplay adapted from the Tracy Chevalier novel of the same name; and the 2005 film Breakfast on Pluto among others.

His most recent projects were roles in the films Becoming Jane (2007) and House of Boys (2009).

As well as acting McHallem is also a script writer. In 2001 he wrote and directed the short film This Little Piggy about two cops in Dublin, who try to find a missing finger at a cab rank. He was also one of the writers on the Liza Tarbuck comedy Linda Green (2001) and was the writer of the television comedy Big Dippers in 2005, which starred James Nesbitt.

Recently Chris has returned to music as singer and songwriter with the mysterious, Five Mile Family.

His radio play, Farkham Hall at Christmas, was broadcast in December 2015 on Ireland's RTE Radio 1.

External links

1960 births
English male film actors
English male soap opera actors
Living people
Male actors from London